Daniel Eaton (born July 4, 1993 in Flagstaff, Arizona) is an American former road cyclist.

Major results
2011
 7th Overall Grand Prix Rüebliland
 10th Overall Tour de l'Abitibi
2014
 1st Valley of the Sun Stage Race
 3rd San Dimas Stage Race
 3rd Arden Challenge
2015
 1st  Time trial, National Under–23 Road Championships
 1st Stage 1 Valley of the Sun Stage Race
 10th Time trial, UCI Road World Under–23 Championships
2016
 6th Overall Tour of Alberta
2017
 4th Overall Cascade Cycling Classic

References

External links

 
 
 

1993 births
Living people
American male cyclists
People from Flagstaff, Arizona
Sportspeople from Arizona